Chen Boyang (born 6 May 2000) is a Chinese badminton player. He won his first senior title at the Vietnam International Series in 2022 with his partner Liu Yi.

Career 
Chen competed in his first tournament with Guo Ruohan at the 2017 China International. He lost in the second round.

In November 2022, he formed a new partnership with Liu Yi and won his first tournament at the Vietnam International Series. In that same month, Chen and Liu won their second title at the Malaysia International Series tournament.

In March 2023, he and Liu won their first BWF World Tour title at the 2023 Ruichang China Masters.

Achievements

BWF World Tour (1 title) 
The BWF World Tour, which was announced on 19 March 2017 and implemented in 2018, is a series of elite badminton tournaments sanctioned by the Badminton World Federation (BWF). The BWF World Tours are divided into levels of World Tour Finals, Super 1000, Super 750, Super 500, Super 300, and the BWF Tour Super 100.

Men's doubles

BWF International Challenge/Series (2 titles) 
Men's doubles

  BWF International Challenge tournament
  BWF International Series tournament
  BWF Future Series tournament

References

External links 

 

2000 births
Living people
Badminton players from Jiangxi
Chinese male badminton players
21st-century Chinese people